Azygophleps albofasciata is a moth in the family Cossidae. It is found in India and Pakistan.

References

Moths described in 1879
Azygophleps